The Darby 1919 lynching attempt was the attempted lynching of Samuel Gorman  in Darby, Pennsylvania on July 23, 1919. Samuel Gorman, a 17-year-old black boy was sent to jail for the alleged murder of William E. Taylor.

Attempted lynching

Samuel Gorman, a 17-year-old African-American worked for hay merchant William E. Taylor who owned the shop on 503 Main Street. On July 23, 1919, Taylor told him that he didn't have any more work for Gorman and he allegedly hit him over his head, fatally wounding him. Gorman was quickly apprehended by Chief of Police Clark. Word got out that the suspect had been arrested and a white mob quickly surrounded the jail. The police were called out en masse to prevent the mob from storming the building.

Aftermath

This uprising was one of several incidents of civil unrest that began in the so-called American Red Summer, of 1919. The Summer consisted of terrorist attacks on black communities, and white oppression in over three dozen cities and counties. In most cases, white mobs attacked African American neighborhoods. In some cases, black community groups resisted the attacks, especially in Chicago and Washington, D.C. Most deaths occurred in rural areas during events like the Elaine Race Riot in Arkansas, where an estimated 100 to 240 black people and 5 white people were killed. Also occurring in 1919 were the Chicago Race Riot and Washington D.C. race riot which killed 38 and 39 people respectively, and with both having many more non-fatal injuries and extensive property damage reaching up into the millions of dollars.

See also
Washington race riot of 1919
Mass racial violence in the United States
List of incidents of civil unrest in the United States

Bibliography 
Notes

References   

 Alt URL
   
   
 - Total pages: 234  

1919 in Pennsylvania
1919 in military history
1919 riots in the United States
July 1919 events
African-American history between emancipation and the civil rights movement
History of racism in Pennsylvania
Racially motivated violence against African Americans
Red Summer
Riots and civil disorder in Pennsylvania
White American riots in the United States
Lynching attempts